Wandsworth London Borough Council, England, is elected every four years. From 2002 to 2018, 60 councillors were elected from 20 wards. Following ward boundary changes, in 2022 58 councillors were elected in 22 wards returning either 2 or 3 councillors each.

Political control
The first election to the council was held in 1964, initially operating as a shadow authority before the new system came into full effect in 1965. Political control of the council since 1964 has been held by the following parties:

Leadership
The leaders of the council since 1965 have been:

Council elections
 1964 Wandsworth London Borough Council election
 1968 Wandsworth London Borough Council election (boundary changes took place but the number of seats remained the same)
 1971 Wandsworth London Borough Council election
 1974 Wandsworth London Borough Council election
 1978 Wandsworth London Borough Council election (boundary changes increased the number of seats by one)
 1982 Wandsworth London Borough Council election
 1986 Wandsworth London Borough Council election
 1990 Wandsworth London Borough Council election
 1994 Wandsworth London Borough Council election (boundary changes took place but the number of seats remained the same)
 1998 Wandsworth London Borough Council election
 2002 Wandsworth London Borough Council election (boundary changes reduced the number of seats by one) 
 2006 Wandsworth London Borough Council election
 2010 Wandsworth London Borough Council election
 2014 Wandsworth London Borough Council election
 2018 Wandsworth London Borough Council election
 2022 Wandsworth London Borough Council election (boundary changes reduced the number of seats by two)

Borough result maps

By-election results

1964-1968
There were no by-elections.

1968-1971

1971-1974

1974-1978

1978-1982

1982-1986

1986-1990

1990-1994

The by-election was called following the death of Cllr. Eric J. Somerville-Jones.

1994-1998
There were no by-elections.

1998-2002

The by-election was called following the death of Cllr. William F. D. Hawkins.

The by-election was called following the resignation of Cllr. Rev. Andrew P. B. White.

2002-2006
There were no by-elections.

2006-2010
There were no by-elections.

2010-2014

The by-election was called following the resignation of Cllr. Edward J. U. Lister.

The by-election was called following the resignation of Lucy Allan.

2014-2018

The by-election was triggered by the death of Councillor Adrian Knowles of the Conservative Party. The by-election was held on the same day as the 2015 general election.

The by-election was triggered by the resignation of Councillor Ben Johnson of the Labour Party, following his appointment as an adviser to the Mayor of London, Sadiq Khan.

 This by-election was triggered by the death of Councillor Sally-Ann Ephson of the Labour Party.

2018–2022

The by-election was triggered by the resignation of Councillor Hannah Stanislaus of the Labour Party

The by-election was triggered by the death of Councillor Andy Gibbons of the Labour Party

References

External links
 Wandsworth Council